Fleck may refer to:

 Fleck (name), a surname
 Ludwik Fleck Prize (Fleck Prize), an annual science and technology prize
 Norma Fleck Award (Fleck Award), an annual Canadian children's non-fiction literary award
 Fleck Family Foundation, the sponsor of the Norma Fleck Award
 Fleck/Paterson House (Fleck House), a building in Ottawa, Ontario, Canada

Other uses
 Fleck corneal dystrophy (Francois-Neetens speckled corneal dystrophy), a corneal dystrophy where small flecks in the stroma is a symptom
 Carnation necrotic fleck virus (CNFV), a plant virus
 Sunfleck, intermittent flecks of sunlight

See also
 Flecker (surname)
 Flake (disambiguation)